Chitubihar is a settlement in Kathmandu District in the Bagmati Zone of central Nepal and part of Kirtipur Municipality. At the time of the 1991 Nepal census it had a population of 4,538 and had 805 households in it.

References

Populated places in Kathmandu District